Bosemprella incarnata is a species of bivalve belonging to the family Tellinidae.

The species is found in Western Europe and Mediterranean.

References

Tellinidae
Taxa named by Carl Linnaeus
Bivalves described in 1758
Bivalves of Europe